The Indiana Academy of Science is a non-profit organization for the advancement of science.  It is based in Indiana and was founded in 1885.

The first meeting was held December 29, 1885 in the Marion County Courthouse, Indianapolis.  The Academy was officially incorporated December 21, 1887.  The Proceedings of the Indiana Academy of Science began with volume 1 in 1891, published in 1892 and containing the papers from 1885 through 1891; it has been published annually since then.

Presidents of the Academy
The Academy has had the following presidents:

References

External links
Official website
Archives of the Proceedings of the Indiana Academy of Science 1891-2002
Indiana Academy of Science collection, Rare Books and Manuscripts, Indiana State Library

Academies of sciences
Science and technology in Indiana
1885 establishments in Indiana
Scientific organizations established in 1885
Organizations based in Indiana